Variations for Orchestra, Op. 31 (1926–28) is an orchestral set of variations on a theme, composed by Arnold Schoenberg and is his first twelve-tone composition for a large ensemble. Premiered in December 1928 by the Berlin Philharmonic conducted by Wilhelm Furtwängler, it was greeted by a tumultuous scandal.

The theme of the piece is stated in measures 34–57. The orchestration includes a flexatone. The piece features the BACH motif (B–A–C–B). The tone row in its four permutations (labeled Prime, Retrograde, Inversion, and Retrograde Inversion) are shown below.

Schoenberg opened a lecture on the composition with the following tyranny of the majority defense of less common aesthetics: "Far be it from me to question the rights of the majority. But one thing is certain: somewhere there is a limit to the power of the majority; it occurs, in fact, wherever the essential step is one that cannot be taken by all and sundry."

The piece has been arranged for two pianos by Charles Wuorinen and this arrangement was set to a ballet, Schoenberg Variations (1996), by Richard Tanner of the New York City Ballet.

Sections
Introduction
Theme
Variation I: Moderato
Variation II: Adagio
Variation III: Mässig
Variation IV: Walzer-tempo
Variation V: Bewegt
Variation VI: Andante
Variation VII: Langsam
Variation VIII: Sehr rasch
Variation IX: L'istesso Tempo
Finale

Sources

Twelve-tone compositions by Arnold Schoenberg
Compositions for symphony orchestra
Variations
1928 compositions